The Australian Hillclimb Championship is a CAMS sanctioned motor sport competition which determines Australia's annual hillclimbing champion. The championship has traditionally been awarded to the driver setting fastest time at a single meeting however the 1958 title was awarded based on the combined results of two meetings and a multi round pointscore series was employed from 1972 to 1975.

The championship has been sanctioned by the Confederation of Australian Motor Sport since 1954. Prior to this it was sanctioned by the Australian Automobile Association, with two events having national championship status in 1949.

Results

References

Hillclimb
Hillclimbs
Hillclimbing series